Billy Lee Evans (born November 10, 1941) is an American politician who served in both the Georgia House of Representatives (1969-1977) and the U.S. House of Representatives (1977 to 1983).

Early life and education 
Evans was born in Tifton, Georgia, in 1941. He attended public schools and earned his bachelor's and law degrees from the University of Georgia.

Career 
Admitted to the Georgia bar in 1965, Evans began practicing law in Macon, Georgia.

Evans was a member of the Georgia House of Representatives from 1969 to 1976. On November 2, 1976, he was elected as a Democrat to the United States Congress. Evans served in Congress from January 3, 1977, to January 3, 1983. He was unsuccessful in his campaign for renomination in 1982, losing the primary to J. Roy Rowland, after accusations arose that he had accepted illegal campaign contributions.

Evans is vice president of government relations for a consulting firm in Washington, D.C. and resides in nearby Vienna, Virginia. He also serves on the Board of Directors of American Freedom Coalition, an organization founded by Christian Right leader Robert Grant and Civil Rights leader Ralph Abernathy.

References

External links

1941 births
Living people
People from Tifton, Georgia
University of Georgia School of Law alumni
Georgia (U.S. state) lawyers
Democratic Party members of the Georgia House of Representatives
Democratic Party members of the United States House of Representatives from Georgia (U.S. state)
People from Macon, Georgia

Members of Congress who became lobbyists